Grond may refer to:

Places
Cavistrau Grond, mountain in Switzerland
De Nieuwe Grond, resort in Suriname
Laaxersee (also known as "Lag Grond"), lake in Switzerland
Lai Grond, lake in Piz Ela

People
Groon XXX (born 1980), Mexican wrestler
Valerio Grond (born 2000), Swiss skier

Fiction
Grond, a battering ram featured in The Lord of the Rings
Grond, a monster in Champions Online
Gronds, a fictional weight unit in Eamon

Other
Cusegl Grond, Romanish legislature in Grisons
Gamma-Ray Burst Optical/Near-Infrared Detector, imaging instrument
Uit oude Grond, album by Heidevolk

Place name disambiguation pages
Disambiguation pages with surname-holder lists